Abeilles FC is a Congolese football club based in Pointe-Noire.

In 1967 the team has won the Congo Premier League.

Honours
Congo Premier League: 1
1967

Stadium
Currently the team plays at the 13500 capacity Stade Municipal de Pointe-Noire.

References

External links
Calciozz
Wikipedia.fr

Football clubs in the Republic of the Congo